Billa II is a 2012 Indian Tamil-language action film directed by Chakri Toleti. It is a prequel to Billa and the film was set at the ending of late 1990's. The story focuses on how David Billa, an ordinary man from the coastal regions of Sri Lanka, becomes a dreaded underworld don. The film stars Ajith Kumar reprising the role of the titular character, leading an ensemble cast including  Vidyut Jammwal, Parvathy Omanakuttan, Bruna Abdullah, Yog Japee, Rohit Khurana, Manoj K. Jayan, Sudhanshu Pandey, Dinesh Lamba, Krishna Kumar, Sricharan, Janaki Sabesh, Madhusudhan Rao and Rahman. The film's soundtrack and background score were composed by Yuvan Shankar Raja, while R. D. Rajasekhar handled the cinematography and Suresh Urs worked as the editor.

The film, produced by Wide Angle Creations in association with the Hinduja Group company IN Entertainment, was officially announced in November 2010, with Vishnuvardhan as the director. Due to schedule clashes, Vishnuvardhan was replaced by Chakri Toleti, with a new script having been penned by a team involving Toleti, Sarath Mandava and Eric Felberg. Principal photography happened between July 2011 and December 2011. The filming primarily took place at Tamil Nadu, Goa, Hyderabad and in Georgia. Billa II was released worldwide on 13 July 2012.

Plot
David Billa, a Sri Lankan refugee, along with several others, arrives at a camp in Rameswaram, where he befriends Ranjith. The refugee camp is constantly terrorised by corrupt police Inspector Raghubir Sinha. Billa attacks Raghubir when he tries to forcefully detain one of his friends and, in return, gets tortured in a police cell. Billa vows to make him suffer. He goes to meet his widowed sister in Chennai as she is his sole living relative, but is shunned by her due to his criminal past in Lanka. A few days later, Billa and Ranjith are hired to transport fish from Rameswaram to Chennai, which is a plot by Raghubir to trap them as the truck they are driving has diamonds inside. Police intercept them to arrest them, but Billa realizes the play and kills all the cops. Despite Ranjith advising fleeing with the Diamonds, Billa drives the truck to its destination, where they meet Hotel owner Selvaraj. Raghubir's ally Mustafa bai comes minutes later and tells him that Billa has escaped with the Diamonds. Selvaraj realizes the ploy and kills Bhai. Selvaraj is pleased with Billa's loyalty and employs him & Ranjith in his illegal business. Days later, Billa murders Raghubir in a brothel and also kills an egoistic immigration officer who had insulted him earlier.

Months later, a Goan Criminal, Kotiswara Rao, visits Selvaraj and asks for help in selling off the heroin he had brought along with him. Selvaraj refuses, but Billa volunteers to sell it off and tries to deal the heroin with a local thug who refuses to pay for it in return. In a brutal scuffle that ensues where one of Billa's friends is slaughtered, Billa kills them all and goes directly to Koti's boss Abbasi in Panaji with the money and the heroin, which is very impressed and recruits him. Abbasi is a drug trafficker and the boss of the biggest drug cartel in Goa. Abbasi is in business with powerful and dreaded Russian gun dealer, Dimitri.

When Billa and Ranjith retrieve Dmitri's arms consignment held by the Indian coastal guard, they enter his good books. Billa climbs the ladder of Abbasi's gang quickly. He learns of his elder sister's death and brings his niece Jasmine with him. He provides her with a big house and servants, and enrolls her in a medical college. Billa and Koti travel to Russia to meet Dimitri, who own a large arms and ammunition manufacturing unit. Billa meets corrupted interpol officer Jagdish in Dimitri's mansion, and is astonished by the functioning of the mafia and its international network. Billa signs a larger deal with Dimitri without Abbasi's knowledge. at the same time, Dimitri kills Bobby, Abbasi's henchman who comes with Koti and Billa as a translator. Dimitri and Jagdish then reveals that Bobby is actually a interpol spy who was really betraying Abbasi's gang. After coming back to Panaji, Koti misleads Abbasi as Billa kills Bobby and directly started business with Dimitri, which creates rivalry between Billa and Abbasi. Tensions further increase when Billa beats up Satish Kumar, son of an influential minister, Praveen Kumar, when he tries to misbehave with Jasmine in a party. Abbasi expresses his discontent and vents at him. Billa, surprised and enraged at his ingratitude, walks away with Ranjith and two others. Billa, Ranjith, and ally Ram plot to venture into the drug business on their own during the carnival. At the carnival, Billa is betrayed by Ram and is brutally attacked. However, he survives and kills the assailants, Abbasi and Ram, eventually becoming Goa's most powerful gangster. He begins a relationship with Abbasi's girlfriend, Sameera.

Dimitri arrives in Goa and finds himself in a fallout with Billa, when they try to re-negotiate a deal. Dimitri thereafter seeks to oust him, with the help of Koti, Satish, and Praveen. They proceed to assassinate Chief Minister Mohan Kanth, and the blame falls upon Billa. However, Billa is freed by Ranjith, who threatens the judge and his family. Billa rescues Jasmine from Koti's men and informs Sameera to take Jasmine to safety. But Sameera betrays Billa, informs the minister's son, who holds Billa and Jasmine captives. Billa, while being held to the ground and is mocked at by Satish, who slits Jasmine's throat. Enraged at her death, Billa overpowers and kills everyone.

Meanwhile, in Russia, Dimitri is having a meeting with the African warlords, and Koti is present with him. He shows his factory in his computer via a series of webcams, and much to everyone's shock, Billa is seen destroying his factory. He also sees his consignment train go off course. He gets angered and kills Koti for not killing Billa, and he sets out himself to finish the task. The arms factory is destroyed by Billa, Ranjith and their men. Dimitri arrives and follows his delivery train, when to his shock, the delivery train is blown by Billa, who is waiting for him on his own helicopter. After an intense battle, Billa throws Dmitri off the flying helicopter. In the epilogue, Billa and Ranjith board a plane out of the country, and Sameera, Police Officer R.K. De Silva, Billa's Lawyer and Minister Praveen Kumar are killed by Billa's assassins.

Cast

 Ajith Kumar as David Billa 
 Parvathy Omanakuttan as Jasmine, Billa's niece
 Vidyut Jammwal as Dimitri, Russian arms dealer
 Yog Japee as Ranjith, Billa's friend and right-hand man
 Bruna Abdullah as Sameera
 Sudhanshu Pandey as Abbasi
 Manoj K. Jayan as Kotiswara Rao, Abbasi's main man
 Ilavarasu as Selvaraj
 Sricharan as Bobby
 Sriman as Billa's Lawyer
 Madhusudhan Rao as Goa Chief Minister Mohan Kanth
 Dinesh Lamba as Praveen Kumar, Influential Goan Minister
 Rohit Khurana as Satish Kumar, Praveen Kumar's son and a gangster
 Sarath Mandava as Ram
 Janaki Sabesh as David Billa's sister
 Krishna Kumar as Raghubir Sinha, Corrupt Inspector
 Theepetti Ganesan as Muthu 
 Ashok Bentwal
 Rahman as Jagdish (quick cameo, reprising a role from Billa 1)
 Byron Gibson as Russian Mafia Boss
 Ron Smoorenburg as Russian Martial Artist
 Balaji Shathivel as Billa 's henchmen
 Yuvan Shankar Raja as a special appearance 
 Meenakshi Dixit special appearance in the item number "Madurai Ponnu"
 Nicole Amy Madell special appearance in the item number "Yedho Mayakkam" and "Gangster" 
 Gabriela Bertante special appearance in the item number "Yedho Mayakkam"
 Ashok Selvan as young Billa in photograph (uncredited role)

Production

Development
In 2008, reports claimed that Soundarya Rajinikanth was planning to make a follow-up after noting Billas commercial success, to be produced by Ocher Studios in association with Warner Bros. However, the sequel did not materialise and the idea was dropped, with Ajith Kumar, Vishnuvardhan and Soundarya getting busy with other projects.

In 2010, sources confirmed that Vishnuvardhan had finished penning the script for a prequel, which would star Ajith Kumar as the titular character again, and would commence in 2011. The project became officially announced in late 2010, after Ajith Kumar signed up to the prequel and first production poster were published to the media. Further details were disclosed, with Suresh Balaje, son of producer and actor K. Balaji, who produced the original Billa with Rajinikanth, and George Pius from Wide Angle Creations banner, being confirmed as the producer, who would associate with Mumbai-based IN Entertainment Limited, a Hinduja group company. The entire production team of the Billa remake, including cinematographer Nirav Shah, editor A. Sreekar Prasad and music director Yuvan Shankar Raja, were announced to be retained for the sequel.

In a turn of events, Vishnuvardhan opted out of the project citing that his dates clashed with the making of his Telugu film, Panjaa (earlier titled as The Shadow). Chakri Toleti who directed the 2009 Kamal Haasan-Mohanlal starrer Unnaipol Oruvan was subsequently signed on by the producers to direct the venture. In May 2011, Chakri Toleti held his first press conference stating that production would begin in late June 2011 and revealing that "Billa 2 would focus on how David, an ordinary man from the coastal Thoothukudi in South Tamil Nadu, becomes Billa, a dreaded underworld don". David's character was afterwards widely reported to be either a refugee from Tamil Eelam or a Tamilian from Sri Lanka. Both the director and the producer refused to confirm the statements, disclosing only that the film would depict David's journey over a period of five years.

With Vishnuvardhan's exit from the project, his script was also scrapped, and Toleti, along with Ajith Kumar, began penning a new script for the prequel. Yuvan Shankar Raja only was retained from the original production team, with the rest of the technical crew being finalised in the following weeks. Hemant Chaturvedi, who hitherto had worked in Bollywood productions only, was signed on to replace Nirav Shah as the cinematographer after the latter's schedules clashed with the making of his other film, Vettai. However, in July 2011, Hemant Chaturvedi too moved out of the project, fearing that the delay in commencement of Billa 2 may hurt his chances in Bollywood, and R. D. Rajasekhar was appointed as the new cinematographer. V. Selvakumar who had notably worked in Madrasapattinam was selected as the art director. The crew also announced that the film would become the first Indian production to be filmed with a RED EPIC Camera, being shot at 5K resolution. Writer Ee. Raa. Murugan, who had previously collaborated with Chakri Toleti in the Kamal Haasan-starrer Unnaipol Oruvan, was appointed to write the dialogue.

Casting
From the previous film, the producers made it clear that apart from Ajith Kumar, and Rahman, most of the other characters would not be retained. The female lead role was expected to be handed to Anushka Shetty, but despite media speculation she was not signed on. The female lead role was handed to debutant Huma Qureshi, a Mumbai-based theatre actor who had previously been featured in commercials, with Toleti finalising Qureshi after a nationwide search for an actress. However, she was removed from the project by September 2011, due to date clashes, and became replaced by Miss India World 2008 Parvathy Omanakuttan later that month, who the director had spotted and offered the role of Jasmine at a fashion show. Parvathy described her character as a "simple girl who transforms into a modern person" and that Billa looks up to, adding that she was had more scenes in the "emotional part" of the film. Bollywood actress and model Bruna Abdullah was selected to portray another significant character, which she went on term as "super powerful, very strong and sexy". Besides models Abdullah, and Parvathy Omanakuttan, Meenakshi Dixit was recruited for the item number "Madurai Ponnu". Another three models including, Gabriela Bertante, Nicole Amy Madell, and an unknown artist, was recruited to perform a dance number "Yedho Mayakkam".

Television actor Krishna Kumar, was signed on to play a "dirty cop". In June 2011, Sudhanshu Pandey, a former model who has appeared in several Hindi films, was given the role of a "greying ganglord", who becomes the mentor to the young David, whilst Malayalam character actor Manoj K. Jayan was roped in for a "key role". Actress Vimala Raman was signed on to make a special appearance in the film, however she opted out in July 2011 citing date problems. Meenakshi Dixit was later finalised for that role and shot her scenes in July 2011 during the first schedule. Vidyut Jamwal, who played negative roles in the Hindi film Force (2011) and the Telugu film Oosaravelli (2011), was selected to play the villain, also making his debut in Tamil cinema. In December 2011 sources revealed that Sricharan, who starred in Payanam, was shooting for a supporting role in the film. Reports in February 2012 suggested that the team was trying to sign Nayantara, who played the female lead in Billa, for a cameo role; the actress refuted the rumours. Furthermore, composer Yuvan Shankar Raja on Toleti's insistence agreed to make a brief appearance in one of the songs. Sources also reported that director Seeman would be acting in the film.

Filming
The film's production was delayed as Ajith Kumar's previous film, Mankatha, progressed beyond the anticipated completion dates. In March 2011, the producers released a press note that the film would begin in early May 2011, however this failed to happen. During that period, it was also suggested that Billa II may not be Ajith Kumar's successive project and commence only after the actor completed a film with M. Raja. Eventually, a photo shoot was held in June 2011 with Ajith sporting an appearance of a man in his mid-twenties. Principal photography commenced on 14 July 2011 at the Ramoji Film City in Hyderabad. Filming during the first 30-day schedule throughout July and August 2011 was held in Hyderabad and Vizag. As part of the schedule, one song was shot in Puducherry under the direction of choreographer Raju Sundaram. Both actresses Parvathy Omanakuttan and Bruna Abdullah joined the crew for the second schedule in Goa, that lasted for 39 days and ended in the first week of November.

In the third week of November, a unit of thirty-six members left for Georgia in Eastern Europe for the final 20-day schedule of the film. In Georgia, the crew filmed at the country's capital, Tbilisi, Borjomi and Rustavi. Billa II became the first Indian film to be shot at the Likani Palace, which functions as a summer residence of the President of Georgia. Midway through the filming, heavy snowfall began. The crew, however, carried on shooting and later reshot the complete sequence with the snowy background to maintain the continuity. The climax portions were also filmed there against a snowy backdrop, for which aerial shots were done from a helicopter. Approximately half a million dollars were spent for the whole schedule in Georgia, which was finished by mid-December. In February 2012, the remaining scenes, including the film's title song, were canned at the Ramoji Film City in Hyderabad, despite the ongoing strike in the film industry. An item number "Yedo Mayakkam" featuring three models was shot in a studio in Goa. Although producer Kheterpal had named Bangkok, Thailand as a potential location for filming, shooting was not held there. The entire filming was completed over a period of 90 days.

Three stunt choreographers were involved in the making of Billa II. The stunt sequences in Georgia were partly choreographed by an award-winning German-based company led by stuntman Stefan Richter, while the climax action scenes were done by Kecha Khamphakdee's Jaika Stunt team. K. Rajasekhar choreographed the fight sequences in Hyderabad and Goa. Madhu Sudhanan, a VFX creative director, said that VFX had been used in action sequences, in "set extensions" and in sequences involving 3D.

Soundtrack

Yuvan Shankar Raja, who had also worked on the score of Billa (2007), composed the soundtrack and score of Billa II, becoming his fifth project starring Ajith Kumar. The album consists of six tracks, five songs and a theme music track. The producer however confirmed that the film would feature a sixth song, not included in the soundtrack that was composed for a belly dance sequence. Na. Muthukumar agreed to write the lyrics for the songs. In a departure from convention, the lyrics were penned first which were set to tunes later.

The audio launch was initially to be released in mid-March 2012, but was then pushed to second week of April. Actor Rajinikanth was approached to unveil the soundtrack, with the team supposedly rescheduling the audio launch to suit Rajinikanth's dates, who had left for London for the filming of his film Kochadaiyaan. The soundtrack was unveiled on 1 May 2012, coinciding with Ajith Kumar's birthday. Sony Music Entertainment that marketed the album of Ajith Kumar's previous film Mankatha, acquired the music rights of Billa II as well for an unprecedented sum after some weeks-long negotiations. In the week before the audio launch, Sony Music began releasing teasers of each of the songs every day and promoted them across social platforms. The Telugu version of the soundtrack was released on 5 June 2012 at the Taj Deccan in Hyderabad. The soundtrack received positive response from critics and topped the charts.

Marketing
Billa II underwent an extensive marketing spree before its release. A first teaser poster displaying the new logo design was published in Diwali 2011, while the first posters depicting Ajith Kumar's look were released in January 2012 during the Pongal festival. From late February onwards, further posters featuring Ajith were unveiled, with one poster in late March portraying a young Ajith carrying a kerosene can on a boat that led to speculations over the character's origin. On 13 April 2012, a one-minute teaser trailer was uploaded to YouTube. The teaser garnered over 500,000 views within the first three days of its release, setting a new record for Tamil films.

As part of the marketing, the makers planned to release a Billa 2 calendar featuring the two lead actresses, Parvathy Omanakuttan and Bruna Abdulla; the stills were shot exclusively for the calendar in Goa. An event to launch the official theatrical trailer was planned to be held on 2 July at the Anna Centenary Library auditorium in Kotturpuram, Chennai. The entire cast and crew along with Russian dancers were expected to attend the function, which was to be telecast on television later. The event was cancelled at short notice. The trailer was however uploaded to YouTube the same day, gaining record views. Moreover, a promotional video featuring Ajith with composer Yuvan Shankar Raja was shot as well, but was not released either.

Release
Billa 2 was released in 2500 theatres worldwide.  On the first day, Mayajaal Multiplex released Billa 2 in all screens and all shows – a total of 102 shows in 14 screens. 
The overseas distribution rights were sold for 53 million to the US-based company GK Media, the highest ever for an Ajith film. In March 2012, The Sun TV bought the satellite rights for a record price, with sources estimating the price at  6 million. The Television Premier was occurred in June 23' 2013 @ 6:30pm. Three prominent production houses were reportedly trying to purchase the domestical theatrical rights then. Venu Ravichandran's Aascar Films eventually acquired the theatrical distribution rights of Tamil Nadu for  260 million. All the distribution rights of the film, except the Kerala and Hindi dubbing rights had been sold at a record price of more than  400 million, making Billa II one of the top pre-release revenue generating films of all time in the Tamil film industry. In early May 2012, the Kerala release rights were finally sold to Sagara Entertainment and Money Tree Entertainment for  8million, likewise a new record for an Ajith film. Billa II received an adult rating ("A" certificate) from the Central Board of Film Certification due to its "violent theme and presentation", without any major cuts. In the UK, the film was issued an 15 certificate by the British Board of Film Classification with an advice that it contained "very strong violence and revenge theme".

Billa II was initially planned to release on 13 April 2012, coinciding with Tamil New Year, but the release was postponed to 1 May 2012, coinciding with Ajith Kumar's birthday, with the makers considering to bring forward the film by four days to release it on a Friday. However, the release became further delayed and was pushed to the second half of May 2012. After considering the first four Fridays in June 2012 for the film's release, the producer finally zeroed in on 13 July as the release date.

Billa 2 was released across over 1,400 screens worldwide, making it one of the largest Tamil releases ever. The film was released simultaneously in the four southern states, Tamil Nadu, Karnataka, Andhra Pradesh and Kerala as well as in North India and international markets. In Tamil Nadu, it opened across 550 theatres, while a dubbed Telugu version of the film released in Andhra Pradesh as David Billa. In Kerala, the Tamil version was screened and Karnataka saw the release of both the versions. The film was also released by Aanna Films in most of the major multiplexes in France with French subtitles; in Malaysia, North India and the Gulf Nations, Malay, Hindi and Arabic subtitles were added to the film, respectively, while in other international markets, it was screened with English subtitles.

Reception
Billa 2 mainly received mixed reviews from critics and audience, with praise on cast's performances, Yuvan's music and cinematography, while the film's pace, screenplay and direction received criticism. Karthik Subramanian of The Hindu said, "Where the movie lacks in substance, it does try to score with technical aspects. The camerawork by R. D. Rajasekhar, background score by Yuvan Shankar Raja and editing by Suresh Urs are superlative for the most part", and that the film "does live up to the hype". MSN India said "'Billa 2' would be an interesting film only if you are an ardent fan of Ajith. Otherwise, it is an average film with a weak script spoiling the show."

Meena Iyer of The Times of India recommended it with a 3 star rating, "If you're  Ajith fan—Billa 2 is a must. If you're an action aficionado, it's a treat. If you're neither, then don't bother." Indiaglitz called it as a slick entertainer running for just 129 minutes. Prathibha Parameswaran of IBN Live said, "If you liked Billa and Mankatha, and expected as much from the prequel, it falls well short of expectations." and further wrote, "watch it only for Thala." Anupama Subramanian of Deccan Chronicle rated the film 3 out of 5 stars and said, "The film works to a great extent because of the sheer screen presence of a star called Ajith Kumar. After all, it is his film all the way!"

Box office

India
In the domestic market, Billa II had a great opening with 100% occupancy in single screens and multiplexes. In the opening week, it grossed around  4.79 crore at the Chennai box office, and after 5 weeks, it amounted to  7.79 crore after tax deduction. It grossed around 41 crore at Tamil Nadu, 2.4 crore at Kerala, 2.1 crore at Karnataka, 2 crore at Andhra and 1 crore at rest of India. The film did not get exemption from entertainment tax due to A certificate. It yielded  7 crore or 10 per cent of the total entertainment tax revenue of the year for the exchequer.

Overseas
In Malaysia, Billa II collected US$348,000 The film grossed $78,000 in the UK and approximately $20,000 in Australia.

References

External links
 
 

2010s Tamil-language films
2012 action thriller films
2012 crime action films
2012 crime thriller films
2012 films
Films about organised crime in India
Films directed by Chakri Toleti
Films scored by Yuvan Shankar Raja
Films shot in Andhra Pradesh
Films shot in Georgia (country)
Films shot in Goa
Films shot in Puducherry
Films shot in Tbilisi
Indian action thriller films
Indian crime action films
Indian crime thriller films
Indian gangster films
Prequel films
Indian prequel films